"Razor's Edge" is a single by Meat Loaf released in 1983. It is from the album Midnight at the Lost and Found.

Track listing

7" version
 "Razor's Edge"
 "You Can Never Be Too Sure About The Girl"

12" version
 "Razor's Edge (Remix)"
 "Paradise By The Dashboard Light (Long Version)"
 "Read'Em And Weep"

12" Special Edition
 "Razor's Edge
 "You Never Can Be Too Sure About The Girl"
 "Don't You Look At Me Like That (Alternative Version)"

Charts 

Meat Loaf songs
1983 singles
1983 songs
Epic Records singles